Caversham Lock is a lock and main weir on the River Thames in England at Reading, Berkshire. Both the lock and main weir are connected to De Bohun Island (colloquially known as Lock Island). The Thames Navigation Commissioners built the original lock in 1778. Additional sluices north of View Island and Heron Island form the whole weir complex. A footbridge passes over all three islands to connect Lower Caversham to Reading via a route other than George Street and Reading Bridge.

The weir is upstream of the lock and in the mid-channel. Kings Meadow, Reading, and buildings comprising homes and office blocks adjoin to the south of the lock itself. The island contains a typical lock-keeper's house, a crane depot, small boatyard, and large boathouse owned by the Environment Agency for occasional use by that authority and police in river patrol and maintenance of boats.

The head of water provided by the weir is used by Reading Hydro to generate up to 46 kW of electricity.

History

A weir, mill, ferry, and flash lock on the site were referenced in 1493 when granted to Notley Abbey. The pound lock opened in 1778, but the long promised lock house was not built until after 1819. In 1871 Reading Corporation planned to build a swing bridge over the lock upstream, but did not implement the plan. The lock was rebuilt in 1875.

Access to and across the lock
The lock is about 400 metres east of Reading railway station and well connected to Kings Meadow, the largest park of central Reading.

Access to the north is to part of the Lower Caversham neighborhood of the former village of Caversham (considered a Reading suburb administratively since it joined the Borough of Reading), and the route is open as a public footpath.

Reach above the lock
Soon after the lock, there is Reading Bridge followed by Fry's Island in the middle of the river. The built-up part of Reading stretches 500m (on the southern side) to Caversham Bridge. A gangway spans from Reading to Pipers Island, with a restaurant that covers more than 75% of the gangway.

The northern bank passes by Caversham. St Mary's Island is close to the bank at the far end of Caversham (seen on maps also as Upper and Lower Large). Further west of St Mary's Island, Mapledurham House comes into view as the river continues almost northwards towards Mapledurham Lock.

Reading Amateur Regatta is held annually in June between St Mary's Island and Caversham Bridge. Reading Festival is held on August Bank Holiday at Little John's Farm on Richfield Avenue near Caversham Bridge. A temporary structure called Reading Festival Bridge links the site with parking and camping areas along the north bank open meadows during the festival. In these areas the Chiltern Hills can be seen in the background.

On the south bank, after the farmed meadows, is Tilehurst, where the river veers briefly north with the two islands of Appletree Eyot and Poplar Island in the center of the river. The railway runs adjacent to the river for more than 600 meters on a high brick embankment to enable it to cut through the end of the escarpment further upstream, on which most of Purley-on-Thames lies.

The Thames Path follows the southern bank. A footpath follows the north bank between Reading and Caversham bridges.
There is an orphan section of the original towpath 1 km downstream of Mapledurham Lock, inaccessible except by boat.

Sports clubs
 Reading Rowing Club
 Reading Canoe Club

See also
Islands in the River Thames
Locks on the River Thames
Crossings of the River Thames

References

External links

 Thames site
 Caversham Life, Living and Community

Islands of the River Thames
Locks of Reading, Berkshire
Pedestrian bridges across the River Thames
Locks on the River Thames
Weirs on the River Thames